Maalai Malar is a daily evening Tamil newspaper. It is owned by Daily Thanti group. It was founded by S. P. Adithanar in 1977 at Coimbatore. Maalai Malar has twelve editions published from Chennai,  Vellore, Dindigul,  Thanjavur, Tirunelveli, Coimbatore, Erode, Madurai, Nagercoil, Pudhucheri, Salem and Tiruchirappalli.

 Dina Thanthi
 Thanthi TV
 Hello FM
 DT Next(Chennai Based English Daily Newspaper)

References

External links
 Malai Malar website

Companies based in Chennai
Mass media in Chennai
Tamil-language newspapers published in India
Evening newspapers published in India
Newspapers published in Chennai
Newspapers published in Coimbatore
Mass media in Coimbatore
Mass media in Madurai
Newspapers published in Tiruchirappalli
Thanthi Group
1977 establishments in Tamil Nadu
Newspapers established in 1977